Odd Nielsen is a Norwegian handball player.

He made his debut on the Norwegian national team in 1957, 
and played 11 matches for the national team between 1957 and 1959. He participated at the 1958 World Men's Handball Championship.

References

Year of birth missing (living people)
Living people
Norwegian male handball players